The Michigan Tech–Northern Michigan men's ice hockey rivalry is a college ice hockey rivalry between the Michigan Tech Huskies men's ice hockey and Northern Michigan Wildcats men's ice hockey programs. The first meeting between the two occurred on October 12, 1979, as an exhibition match. The first official game occurred just over a month later with Michigan Tech winning the inaugural meeting.

History
Michigan Tech played its first ice hockey game in 1920 and had the Upper Peninsula to itself for nearly 50 years. Northern Michigan played its first game in 1976 and swiftly rose to prominence in the CCHA. Two years later, Michigan Tech was one of four teams to leave the WCHA and joined the CCHA. After three years, both schools left the CCHA and joined the WCHA, remaining conference rivals until the late 1990s. Northern Michigan rejoined the CCHA in 1997 and remained with the conference until its dissolution in 2013. During this period, both programs continued to play one another annually. NMU returned to the WCHA in 2013 and rekindled the conference rivalry with MTU. Both programs continued with the conference until they reformed the CCHA jointly with five other programs and began play in the refurbished conference in 2021.

Game results
Full game results for the rivalry, with rankings beginning in the 1995–96 season.

Series facts

References

External links
 Michigan Tech Huskies men's ice hockey
 Northern Michigan Wildcats men's ice hockey

College ice hockey rivalries in the United States
Central Collegiate Hockey Association
Michigan Tech Huskies men's ice hockey
Northern Michigan Wildcats ice hockey
1979 establishments in Michigan